Manuel "Manolo" Julián Cardona Molano (born April 25, 1977) is a Colombian actor.

Personal life
Cardona was born in Popayán, Cauca, Colombia on April 25, 1977. At the age of seven, Cardona's family nicknamed him "Manolo," which later became his stage name. He moved to Cali, Colombia when he was eighteen to study finance and international relations, but later moved to Spain to study film. Manolo's mother, Nancy Molano, is a psychologist, merchant, and astrologer. His father, Enrique Javier Cardona, was a politician and was the mayor of Popayán. Cardona has three brothers and one sister.

Career
Cardona began modeling at an early age after his elder brother introduced him to the modeling agency where he signed his first contract. At the age of fourteen he shot his first television commercial and began modeling professionally for TV commercials, photography, and runways for several agencies in Colombia. In1995, at the age of 18, he began his acting career on a popular Colombian Television series called Padres e hijos in which he starred for three years. In1998 he won his first lead role in the television telenovela Carolina Barrantes. A year later he starred in the telenovela ¿Por qué diablos?, portraying a young man who becomes part of a drug organization so he can avenge his friend's death. In 2001 he appeared in Amor a mil, another Colombian telenoevla. In 2002 he signed an exclusive contract with Telemundo and Argos Comunicación, and a year later in 2003 he starred in his first Mexican telenovela, Ladrón de Corazones, where he portrayed Gustavo Velazco, a man who returns to his home town in Mexico after ten years to avenge his father's death and clear his name. He was the host of Telemundo's Spanish version of Temptation Island. He also played Sebastián on the Mexican telenovela Gitanas. Cardona made his film debut in 2005 with the film Rosario Tijeras, based on Jorge Franco's book of the same name. The film was nominated for a Goya Award for best foreign film. In 2005 the film had its North American premiere at the American Film Institute Festival, in Hollywood.

In 2005 he starred in the film La mujer de mi hermano opposite Bárbara Mori and Christian Meier which was released in the United States in 2006. In 2006 he finished filming Madrid-Mexico with director Enrique Renteria.

After a two-year absence, Cardona returned to work for Telemundo and Argos on the Telemundo production Marina, replacing Mauricio Ochmann as Ricardo. The telenovela was filmed in Acapulco, Mexico.

On September 27, 2007, Cardona was awarded the "Latin Pride Award" in the Back Bay Events Center in Boston. The award honors the accomplishments of Hispanics of different areas and is a production of the Latin Pride Magazine. Cardona appeared in the 2008 Disney film Beverly Hills Chihuahua.

In 2008, Cardona appeared in El Cartel de los Sapos for Caracol TV where he played a drug dealer. The series was filmed in Miami, New York, Colombia, Panamá and Madrid. The series was followed by a film of the same name. Both of which were based on a book written by Andres Lopes alias Florecita, who wrote the book while in prison. The series debuted on Caracol TV on June 5, 2008, continuing until October 2008. Since it premiered in July 2008, El Cartel was the highest rated show on Colombian television. When it premiered on Telemundo in December 2008, it was the highest rated show in the history of the network.

In November 2008, Cardona played a lead role in the film Undertow. Cardona plays the character of Santiago, a gay painter who arrives in a small town and falls in love with Miguel, a married fisherman played by Cristian Mercado who is torn between his love for Santiago and his love for his pregnant wife Mariela (Tatiana Astengo). The film is produced by Dynamo Capital (Colombia) and Calvo Films (Peru), and is directed by Javier Fuentes-León. Undertow also premiered at the San Sebastian Film Festival on September 23, 2010. The film had a great reception at the Sundance Film Festival, winning the Audience Award for World Cinema Drama.

Cardona appeared in an episode of Tiempo final titled "La entrega" in the second season of the series which also co-starred his girlfriend Katarina Sacht. Tiempo final was a remake of the Chilean series of the same name, and aired on Fox.

He acted in La Ultima Muerte alongside Kuno Becker, in 2009. The film premiered in Mexico in November 2009.

Cardona was in the third season of Spain's version of Sin tetas no hay paraíso, which aired on Telecinco. In the series, he played a policeman named Martin La Roca. The series premiered in Spain in fall 2010.

He produced and directed a short film called Risas Inocentes with his brother Juan. The short premiered in Colombia in 2009 and was produced by his film production company 11:11 Films.

He starred in Netflix's Who Killed Sara? as the main character Alex Guzmán. More recently, his 11:11 Films company struck a deal with Viacom International Studios.

Filmography

Film

Television

Awards
 2000: "Best Actor of Colombia" from TV y Novelas.
 2001: "The Best Colombian Leading Actor of the Year" in Houston; a tribute paid by the Hispanic community in the United States.
 2008: "Best Supporting Actor" from Imagen Foundation Awards for Beverly Hills Chihuahua.

References

External links
 
 Manolo Cardona Official site 

1977 births
Colombian male film actors
Colombian people of Catalan descent
Colombian male telenovela actors
Living people